Chidambaram is a Lok Sabha (Parliament of India) constituency in Tamil Nadu. Its Tamil Nadu Parliamentary Constituency number is 27 of 39. The seat is reserved for scheduled castes. It spread on district of Ariyalur and Cuddalore.

Assembly segments
After 2009, Chidambaram Lok Sabha constituency is composed of the following assembly segments:

Before 2009, Chidambaram Lok Sabha constituency was composed of the following assembly segments:
Kurinjipadi
Bhuvanagiri
Kattumannarkoil (SC)
Chidambaram
Mangalore (SC)
Vridhachalam

Members of Parliament

Election results

General Election 2019

General Election 2014

General Election 2009

General Election 2004

See also
 Chidambaram
 List of Constituencies of the Lok Sabha
Ariyalur

References

 Election Commission of India https://web.archive.org/web/20081218010942/http://www.eci.gov.in/StatisticalReports/ElectionStatistics.asp

External links
Chidambaram lok sabha  constituency election 2019 date and schedule

Lok Sabha constituencies in Tamil Nadu